William is a masculine given name which may refer to:

Fictional characters 
 William Afton, a major antagonist in the Five Nights at Freddy's game franchise
 William Birkin, in the Resident Evil game franchise
William Brown, the main character of the children's book series Just William by Richmal Crompton
William "Will" Byers, from Stranger Things
 William Ellis, a survivor in the video game Identity V
 Will Graham, in Thomas Harris' novel Red Dragon, the film adaptations Manhunter (1986) and Red Dragon (2002), and the television series Hannibal (2013–2015)
 William Herondale, one of the main characters in the young adult book series The Infernal Devices by Cassandra Clare
 William Riker, first officer on the Enterprise-D in the Star Trek franchise
 William Suarez, one of the main characters of Philippine television series Widows' Web, portrayed by Bernard Palanca
William T. Spears, a reaper in the manga Black Butler by Yana Toboso
William Anthonio Zeppeli, a major character in Phantom Blood, the first part of the Japanese manga series Jojo's Bizarre Adventure

Nobility
Ordered chronologically

British
 William I of England (1027–1087), a.k.a. William the Conqueror or William the Bastard
 William II of England (1056–1100), a.k.a. William Rufus
 William I of Scotland (c. 1142–1214), a.k.a. William the Lion
 William Marshal, 1st Earl of Pembroke (1146/7–1219), Anglo-Norman soldier and statesman
 William IX, Count of Poitiers (1153–1156), first son of Henry II of England
 William III of England (1650–1702), also William II of Scotland, a.k.a. William of Orange
 William IV of the United Kingdom (1765–1837), King of the United Kingdom of Great Britain and Ireland and King of Hanover
 William, Prince of Wales (born 1982), elder son of King Charles III and Diana, Princess of Wales

Dutch
 William I, Count of Holland (1167–1222), Count of Holland
 William II of Holland (1228–1256), also King of Germany
 William I, Prince of Orange (1533–1584), a.k.a. William the Silent
 William II, Prince of Orange (1626–1650), stadtholder of the United Provinces of the Netherlands
 William III of Orange (1650–1702), also William III of England and William II of Scotland
 William IV, Prince of Orange (1711–1751), first hereditary Stadtholder of all the United Provinces
 William I of the Netherlands (1772–1843), Prince of Orange and the first King of the Netherlands and Grand Duke of Luxembourg
 William V, Prince of Orange (1748–1806), last Stadtholder of the Dutch Republic
 William II of the Netherlands (1792–1849), King of the Netherlands, Grand Duke of Luxembourg, and Duke of Limburg
 William III of the Netherlands (1817–1890), King of the Netherlands, Grand Duke of Luxembourg, and Duke of Limburg

French
 William of Gellone (c.755–814), Count of Toulouse, canonized a saint
 William Longsword (r. 927–942), second duke of Normandy

German
 William I, German Emperor, (1797–1888), Emperor of Germany and King of Prussia
 Wilhelm II, German Emperor (1859–1941), Emperor of Germany and King of Prussia

Sicilian
 William I of Sicily (1131–1166), a.k.a. William the Bad or William the Wicked
 William II of Sicily (1155–1189), a.k.a. William the Good
 William III of Sicily (1190–1198), last Norman King of Sicily, reigning briefly for ten months in 1194

Cameroon
 William I of Bimbia, 19th-century king of the Isubu people
 William II of Bimbia (died 1882), king of the Isubu people

Other
 William II of Villehardouin (died 1278), Prince of Achaea
 William of Werle (died 1436/94-1436), Lord of Werle-Güstrow
 William IV, Grand Duke of Luxembourg (1852–1912)
 William, Prince of Albania (1876–1945), from March to September 1914

Pre-modern era commoners
Ordered chronologically

British
 William (bishop of the Isles) (died 1095), bishop of what later became the Diocese of the Isles
William Aiton (disambiguation), several people
 William de Corbeil (c. 1070–1136), Archbishop of Canterbury
William of Malmesbury (died 1143), English historian and monk
 William of Tyre (c. 1130–1185), Archbishop of Tyre, chronicler of the Crusades
 William of Norwich (c. 1132–1144), saint and martyr
 William of York (died 1154), Archbishop of York and saint
 William (bishop of Moray) (died 1162), Roman Catholic bishop in Scotland
 William the Trouvère, English Anglo-Norman poet and translator 
 William of Ramsey (fl. 1219), English monk and hagiographer
 William (bishop of Dunblane) (died early 1290s), Tironensian abbot and bishop in the Kingdom of Scotland
 William Wallace (c.  1270–1305), Scottish general and one of the main leaders during the Wars of Scottish Independence
 William of Ockham (1287–1347), English friar and philosopher, originator of Occam's Razor
 William of Wykeham (1320–1404), Bishop of Winchester, founder of Winchester College and New College, Oxford
 William Caxton (c. 1422–c. 1491), English merchant, diplomat and writer, thought to be the first person to introduce a printing press into England

French
 William of Poitiers (c. 1020–1090), Norman chronicler, chaplain to William the Conqueror
 William de St-Calais (died 1096), Norman abbot, Bishop of Durham
 William (bishop of Orange) (died 1098), took part in the First Crusade
 William of Champeaux (1070–1121), French philosopher and theologian
 William of Conches (c. 1090–c. 1154), French scholastic philosopher, tutor of Henry II of England
 William of Donjeon (c. 1155–1209), a.k.a. St. William of Bourges and St. William the Confessor, French archbishop
 William the Clerk, Old French poet, writer of the Roman de Fergus
 William the Clerk of Normandy, Norman cleric and Old French poet
 William of Auxerre (died 1231), French theologian

Other
 William (marcha orientalis) (died 871), Margrave of the March of Pannonia, part of the Carolingian Empire
 William (archbishop of Mainz) (929–968), German bishop, son of Emperor Otto the Great
 William of St-Thierry (died 1148), theologian and mystic, abbot of St. Thierry
 William of Moerbeke (1215–1286), Flemish bishop, translator of philosophical, medical, and scientific texts

Modern era
Ordered alphabetically
 William "Jock" Alves ( 1909–1979), Rhodesian physician and politician
 Peduru Hewage William de Silva (1908–1988), Sri Lankan Sinhala Marxist politician
William Adams (disambiguation), several people
 William Ayache (born 1961), French footballer and manager
 Bill Beagan (born 1937), Canadian ice hockey administrator
 William Ball (suffragist) (1862-?), British workers union member who supported women's suffrage
 William Barry (disambiguation), several people
 William Beckett (disambiguation), several people
 William Bell (disambiguation), several people
 William Bradford Bishop (born 1936), American former U.S. foreign service officer accused of killing his family
 William Bonin (1947–1996), American serial killer and rapist
 William H. Bonney, alias of American outlaw Billy the Kid 
 William Boyd (disambiguation), several people
 William Bradford (1946–2008), American murderer 
 William M. Branham (1909–1965), American Christian preacher
 William Byron (racing driver), American NASCAR driver
 William Jennings Bryan (1860–1925), American orator and politician
 William Burke and William Hare (Burke 1792–1829; Hare unknown), Irish serial killers
 W. Sterling Cary (1927–2021), American Christian minister
 Bill Clinton (born 1946), 42nd president of the United States
 William Cooper (1943–2001), American writer, radio host, and political activist
 William Crosfield (1838–1909), British politician
 William Dar (born 1953), Filipino horticulturist and government administrator
 William De Vecchis (born 1971), Italian politician
 William DeVizia (born 1969), American actor
 William "Jack" Dempsey (1895–1983), Irish Native-American boxer and World Heavyweight Champion
 William J. Donovan (1883–1959), American soldier, lawyer, intelligence officer and diplomat
 William Douglas (disambiguation), several people
 William Duane (disambiguation), several people
 William Lukens Elkins (1832–1903), American businessman, inventor and art collector
 William N. Ethridge (1912–1971), chief justice of the Supreme Court of Mississippi
 William Faulkner (1897–1962), American writer
 W. A. Fry (1872–1944), Canadian sport administrator and newspaper publisher
 William Fuller (disambiguation), several people
 Bill Gates (born 1955), American businessman and philanthropist
 William Gay (disambiguation), several people
 William Glasser (1925–2013), American psychiatrist
 William Gopallawa (1896–1981), last Governor-General of Ceylon, first President of Sri Lanka
William Grigahcine (born 1986), French musician professionally known as DJ Snake
 W. G. Hardy (1895–1979), Canadian professor, writer and ice hockey administrator
 William Harrison (disambiguation), several people
 William Randolph Hearst Sr. (1863–1951), American businessman, newspaper publisher and politician
 William Heinecke (born 1949), American-born Thai businessman
 William Holden (1918–1981), American actor
 William Hurt (1950–2022), American actor
 William M. Ireland (? – 1891), American, one of the founders of the National Grange of the Order of Patrons of Husbandry
 William Katt (born 1951), American actor
 William Kelley (disambiguation), several people
 William Lee (disambiguation), several people
 William LeMassena (1916–1993), American actor
 William LeMessurier (1926–2007), American structural engineer
 William L. Leverette (1913–2003), American World War II flying ace
 William Long (disambiguation), several people
 William Michael Lynn (born 1958), American academic
 William MacDonald (1924–2015), English serial killer
 William Bandara Makuloluwa (1922–1984), Sri Lankan musicologist, author, and director
 William P. Marontate (1919–1943), American World War II flying ace
 William McKinley (1843–1901), 25th president of the United States
 William McMahon (1908–1988), 20th prime minister of Australia
 William McNamara (born 1965), American actor
 William Mullins, several people
 William Ephraim Mikell (1868–1944), American legal scholar and lawyer
 William North (disambiguation), several people
 William Ntoso, Ghanaian member of parliament
 William Nylander (born 1996), Swedish ice hockey winger
 Galappatti Kankanange William Perera (1884–1956), Sri Lankan lawyer, educator, diplomat
 William Phipps (1922–2018), American actor and singer, best known for performing the voice of Prince Charming from Disney’s Cinderella
 William Pitt, 1st Earl of Chatham or William Pitt the Elder (1708–1778), British statesman and prime minister
 William Pitt the Younger (1759–1806), British statesman and prime minister
 William H. Quealy (1913–1993), judge of the United States Tax Court
 Don William Rajapatirana (fl. 1930s–1960s), Governor of the Central Bank of Sri Lanka from 1959 to 1967
 William Rice (disambiguation), several people
 William Richardson (disambiguation), several people
 Toby Sexsmith (William Raymond; 1885–1943), Canadian politician and ice hockey administrator
 William Shakespeare (1564–1616), English poet, playwright and actor
 William Shatner (born 1931), Canadian actor
 William Shaw (disambiguation), several people
 William E. Simon (1927–2000), 63rd United States Secretary of the Treasury
 William Smith (disambiguation), several people
 William Howard Taft (1857–1930), 27th president of the United States (1909–1913) 
 W. F. Taylor (1877–1945), founding president of the Canadian Amateur Hockey Association
 William Tennekoon, Governor of the Central Bank of Sri Lanka from 1967 to 1971
 William Yan Thorley (born 2002), Hong Kong marathon swimmer
 William Alfred Tilleke (1860–1917), Ceylon-born Siamese lawyer, entrepreneur and aristocrat
 William Villeger (born 2000), French badminton player
 William Wegman (disambiguation), several people
 William Wei (born 1987), Taiwanese singer-songwriter
 William White (disambiguation), several people
 William Wilberforce (1759–1833), British politician, philanthropist and abolitionist
 William Wolf (disambiguation), several people
 William Wolfe (disambiguation), several people
 William Wolff (disambiguation), several people
 William Wood (disambiguation), several people
 William Woods (disambiguation), several people
 William Wordsworth (1770–1850), English poet
 William Wright (disambiguation), several people
 William Wyatt (disambiguation), several people
 W. B. Yeats (1865–1939), Irish poet
 William Zabka (born 1965), American actor

William